David Macinnis Gill is an American author who writes for young adults.

Career
Gill began his writing career by publishing short stories in small magazines, including The Crescent Review and Writer's Forum. In 2005, Scarecrow Press published his critical biography Graham Salisbury: Island Boy, a reference book intended for scholars of young adult literature. His debut novel, Soul Enchilada was published to acclaim in 2009. A second YA novel, Black Hole Sun, August 2010 has received a starred review from Booklist, as well as recommendations from several authors:

The sins of his father weigh heavily on Durango, an outcast teen mercenary who's trying to eke out a living on tomorrow's gritty, trigger-happy Mars. Fortunately, he is armed with an AI implant, a crew of colorful misfits, and an unshakable sense of humor. David Macinnis Gill rockets readers to new frontiers in this imaginative, action-packed tale. - Suzanne Collins, author of The Hunger Games 

Great story, great characters, and nonstop action. David Gill takes you to a rugged, fast, tough world. - Chris Crutcher, author of Deadline and Staying Fat for Sarah Byrnes 

Black Hole Sun grabbed me by the throat and didn't let go until the last page. In the best tradition of Heinlein and Firefly, Black Hole Sun is for readers who like their books fast-paced, intense, and relentless. Buy it, read it, pass it on!" - Laurie Halse Anderson, author of Wintergirls and Speak

Biography
Gill "has been a house painter, cafeteria manager, bookstore schleper, high school teacher, and college professor. He is represented by Rosemary Stimola of the Stimola Literary Studio.” 
	
Gill started teaching in Chattanooga, Tennessee. After teaching at two different schools around the area, he moved on to the university environment. He was an assistant professor at Ohio University in the English department before he moved to the East Coast to be an associate professor at the University of North Carolina Wilmington in the English education department. David has a “bachelor’s degree in English/creative writing and a doctorate in education, both from the University of Tennessee, as well as an M.ED from Tennessee-Chattanooga.” He is the Past-President of ALAN (The Assembly on Literature for Adolescents), and has written and published everything from short stories to book reviews and critical essays.

Works

Novels for Teens
 Shadow on the Sun (Greenwillow Books, an imprint of HarperCollins), 2013	
 Invisible Sun (Greenwillow Books, an imprint of HarperCollins), 2012	
 Black Hole Sun (Greenwillow Books, an imprint of HarperCollins), 2010	
 Soul Enchilada (Greenwillow Books, an imprint of HarperCollins), 2009

Novels for Adults
 Tin City Tinder - A Boone Childress Novel 2014	
 Steel City Smithereens - A Boone Childress Novel 2014
 Bronzeville Blowback  - A Boone Childress Novel 2014
 Key Lime Die - A Boone Childress Novel 2014
 Boy Mercury - An Antebellum Adventure 2014 (serialized)
 Rural Voices: 15 Authors Challenge Assumptions About Small-Town America Praise The lord and pass the Little Debbies Novella 2020

Novellas
 Rising Sun (Greenwillow Books, an imprint of HarperCollins), 2013

Short Stories
  Broken Circles & Other Stories collection (2014)
 "Broken Circles" (1993) – The Crescent Review
 "People's Song (1996) - Writers' Forum, v. 22, 1996, p. 66-73

Non-Fiction
 Graham Salisbury: Island Boy (Scarecrow Press), 2005

Accolades
 A 2010 ALA Best Books for Young Adults (BBYA) for Soul Enchilada
 A Best of 2009 by Kirkus Reviews
 2010 Stuff for the Teen Age by New York Public Library for Soul Encilada
 2010 Bank Street College Best Books of the Year

References

 Personal website and blog of David Macinnis Gill
 Publisher's website at Harper Teen

External links

Interviews
 Cynthia Leitich Smith Interview
 Debbi Michiko Florence Interview
 JMPrince Interview
 YA Book Central Interview
 Authors On The Verge Interview
 YA Y Not Interview

Blog
 David Macinnis Gill's Personal Blog
 Soul Enchilada Book Webpage

1963 births
American male non-fiction writers
American academics of English literature
University of Tennessee alumni
Living people